The Sensational Spider-Man is a comic book series starring Spider-Man published by Marvel Comics for 35 issues (#0–33, with # -1 published in July 1997 between #17 and 18), from January 1996 until November 1998.

Publication history
The Sensational Spider-Man title was first used for various reprints, including Marvel Treasury Edition #14 (1977), 22 (1979) and 27 (1980) which featured various reprints from Marvel Team-Up and The Amazing Spider-Man, a trade paperback in 1988 featuring Frank Miller's Spider-Man work, and a prestige format one-shot special called The Sensational Spider-Man: Nothing Can Stop the Juggernaut in 1989, which reprinted The Amazing Spider-Man #229 and 230.

The ongoing The Sensational Spider-Man series was initially conceived to be the flagship showcase for the new Ben Reilly version of Spider-Man. It replaced the Web of Spider-Man series.

The initial seven issues (#0–6, January–July 1996) were written and pencilled by Dan Jurgens, who had helped revive interest in Superman for DC Comics in the mid-1990s. Jurgens pushed strongly for the restoration of Peter Parker as the true Spider-Man and plans were made to enact this soon, but Bob Harras, the new Editor-in-Chief, demanded the story be deferred until after the Onslaught crossover. Jurgens had by this stage become disillusioned with the immense amount of group planning and constant changes of ideas and directions. He took this as the last straw, resigning from the title.

He was succeeded by writer Todd DeZago and penciller Mike Wieringo, who remained as the title's regular creative team for the remainder of its run. It lasted for 35 issues (33 regularly numbered issues, as well as an initial issue #0 and the #-1 Flashback issue, released mid-run).

In February 2006, with issue #23, the series Marvel Knights Spider-Man was moved from the Marvel Knights imprint and renamed The Sensational Spider-Man (vol. 2).

Collections
 Spider-Man: The Complete Ben Reilly Epic Book 1 (#0)
 Spider-Man: The Complete Ben Reilly Epic Book 2 (#1)
 Spider-Man: The Complete Ben Reilly Epic Book 3 (#2–3)
 Spider-Man: Ben Reilly Omnibus Vol. 1 (#0-3)
 Spider-Man: The Complete Ben Reilly Epic Book 4 (#4–6)
 Spider-Man: The Complete Ben Reilly Epic Book 5 (#7–10)
 Spider-Man: The Complete Ben Reilly Epic Book 6 (#11) 
 X-Men: The Complete Onslaught Epic Vol. 2 (#8)
 Spider-Man: Revelations (#11)
 Spider-Man: Ben Reilly Omnibus Vol. 2 (#4-11)
 Spider-Man: Savage Land (cover-titled "The Savage Land Saga!") TP (1997) (#13-15)
 Spider-Man by Todd DeZago & Mike Wieringo Vol. 1  (#7-24, -1) (2017) (456 pages)
 Spider-Man: Spider-Hunt (#25–26)
 Spider-Man: Identity Crisis (#27–28)
 Spider-Man: The Gathering of Five (#32–33)

Sources
The Grand Comics Database
The Unofficial Handbook of Marvel Comics Creators

1996 comics debuts
1998 comics endings
Spider-Man titles
Comics by Dan Jurgens